Sichuan pepper chicken, also known as , is a deep-fried chicken dish in Teochew cuisine, typically cooked with leafy green called pearl vegetable (珍珠菜, Lysimachia clethroides). Outside of China, basil, mint, spinach, and other leafy green vegetables are used as substitutes for this vegetable in preparing the dish. The dish is also known for its use of fish sauce and use of Sichuan peppercorns, the dish's namesake.

See also 

 Teochew cuisine

References 

Chinese chicken dishes
Teochew cuisine